Goodman House may refer to:

George E. Goodman Jr. House, Napa, California, listed on the NRHP in Napa County, California
George E. Goodman Mansion, Napa, California, listed on the NRHP in Napa County, California
Timothy Goodman House, West Hartford, Connecticut, NRHP-listed, in Hartford County
J.W. Goodman House, Shelbyville, Kentucky, listed on the NRHP in Shelby County, Kentucky
Goodman–Stark House, Louisiana, Missouri, listed on the NRHP in Pike County, Missouri
Stephen L. Goodman House, Glens Falls, New York, NRHP-listed, in Warren County
Perrill–Goodman Farm House, Groveport, Ohio, listed on the NRHP in Pickaway County, Ohio
Joseph Goodman House, Portland, Oregon, listed on the NRHP in Northwest Portland, Oregon
Goodman–LeGrand House, Tyler, Texas, listed on the NRHP in Smith County, Texas
Daniel Goodman House, Yakima, Washington, listed on the NRHP in Yakima County, Washington

See also
Goodman Building (disambiguation)